Stuff and Dough is a 2001 Romanian drama film directed by Cristi Puiu. The film was screened for the Directors' Fortnight at the 2001 Cannes Film Festival.

Cast 
 Alexandru Papadopol - Ovidiu
 Dragoș Bucur - Vali
 Ioana Flora - Bety
 Luminița Gheorghiu - Mama
 Răzvan Vasilescu - Marcel Ivanov
 Doru Ana - Doncea
 Constantin Drăgănescu - Tata

References

External links 

2001 drama films
2001 films
Films directed by Cristi Puiu
Romanian drama films

2001 directorial debut films